A Turtle's Tale: Sammy's Adventures (known as Sammy's Adventures: The Secret Passage internationally) is a 2010 English-language Belgian-French 3D computer-animated romantic adventure film co-written and directed by Ben Stassen. The film was released on 6 June 2010 in California, and on 11 August 2010 in France. The UK version features the voice talents of Dominic Cooper, Gemma Arterton, John Hurt, Kayvan Novak, and Robert Sheehan; the U.S. version features the voice talents of Yuri Lowenthal, Anthony Anderson, Tim Curry, Kathy Griffin, Melanie Griffith, and Jenny McCarthy.

Plot
On October 28, 1959, Sammy, a Green Sea Turtle, hatches on a deserted beach and while trying to climb up a sand slope is caught by a seagull. He manages to escape along with another hatchling sea turtle named Shelly who was caught by another seagull. Sammy falls onto an old raft and gets carried into the Tasman sea, losing Shelly. He spends the next 50 years traveling the world changed by global warming into the Tasman sea. 

The day after he hatches, Sammy befriends a Leatherback Sea Turtle named Ray, who also just hatched the day before. The two friends grow up together, travelling around the Ocean on their raft. One morning, Ray takes Sammy underwater and introduces him to his newfound friend Slim the day octopus, but they are forced to take shelter from an oil spill, caused by an oil tanker shipwreck. As Sammy and Ray grow bigger and bigger, and the raft begins losing parts, the raft suddenly collapses, leaving Sammy and Ray without their home. While they argue, Sammy, Ray and hundreds of fishes are caught in trawler nets and separated. Hours later, Sammy is thrown back into the sea unconscious, but is saved by a dolphin.

Sammy makes it to shore and the next day finds himself in an enclosure, taken in by human hippies led by a woman named Snow and has the company of a British shorthair named Fluffy. Eventually Sammy shares the enclosure with a larger turtle named Vera, however Vera is released into sea when the Hippies realise the two are not mating. Not long after that, the unauthorized hippies are evicted from their beach by the police, leaving Sammy behind due to Fluffy’s tricks. 

Sammy returns to the ocean and is rejoined by Vera. On a search for food, Sammy and Vera rescue a female turtle, who turns out to be Shelly. Sammy and Shelly travel the oceans and ask around in search of the secret passage Sammy heard of. Finally the two turtles brave the dangers of the Panama Canal but separated as they try to pass a lock. Sammy follows her trail to the Antarctic, where he is picked up by Ecologists and taken to California where he is reunited with Snow (who now works as an Ecologist) and Fluffy once again. 

Soon after he is released back into the ocean, Sammy is requested by two female leatherbacks to help a trapped turtle in a container. His rescue is none other than his old friend Ray. With help from Ray's partner Rita, Sammy explores a wrecked galleon and finds Shelly flirting with another turtle. Rita reveals that a turtle named Robbie is only a playboy. To win Shelly's heart, Ray enlists the help of the toothless shark Albert for Sammy to stage a rescue. Finally reunited with Shelly, the two turtles finally mate along with Ray and Rita return to his own journey. The movie ends as Sammy, now a new grandfather, helps his small grandson out of his nest and urges him to have his own journey into their birthplace on their own hatchlings.

Cast

Music 
Music for the film was composed by Ramin Djawadi. American pop singer Bruno Mars contributed several songs to the film, including his hit singles "Count On Me" and "Talking to the Moon". Michael Jackson's cover of "Ain't No Sunshine" contributed to Sammy's Adventures after his adventure was done. Other songs can also be heard in the film, including "Free" by Donavon Frankenreiter, "Happy People" by Dry Spells, "Love Today" by Mika, "Star Jingle Bells" performed and arranged by Justin Lavallee, "California Dreamin'" by The Mamas & the Papas, "Love Will Find a Way" by Mishon, "You're Not Alone" by Self, and "Shark in the Water" by V V Brown.

Reception

Sequel
A sequel to the film, entitled A Turtle's Tale 2: Sammy's Escape from Paradise, also known as Sammy's Great Escape in the UK, was released in Belgium on 15 August 2012.

References

External links

 

2010 films
2010 3D films
2010 animated films
2010s French animated films
Belgian animated films
StudioCanal films
StudioCanal animated films
2010 computer-animated films
Films scored by Ramin Djawadi
Films directed by Ben Stassen
Films set in Antarctica
Films set in California
Films set in Mexico
Films set in New Caledonia
Films set in the United States
Films set in the 1960s
Films set in the 1970s
Films set in the 1980s
Films set in the 1990s
Films set in the 2000s
English-language French films
Vivendi franchises
3D animated films
2010s English-language films
2010s American films
2010s British films
2010s French films